Nishad (English title: Octave) is a 2002 Indian Hindi film directed by Shaji N. Karun with Archana, Rajit Kapur, Geshe Thupten Phelgye, Master Jhang Ray, Ram Gopal Bajaj and Rameshwari in the lead roles.

It premiered at the Fukuoka International Film Festival held in September 2002 in Japan, was featured at more than ten other international film festivals, and was selected for Indian Panorama, International Film Festival of India.

Plot
Sati Gujaral is a music teacher in a school for Tibetan children run by the Tibetan government-in-exile. Her husband Gopi Gujaral is a doctor in a government hospital. Their only son, Ashok, is a pilot with the Indian Air Force.

The atmosphere is tense with the possibility of a war between India and Pakistan. Ashok calls home unerringly every week bringing joy and some comfort to his anxious mother. One day she gets a call from a boy trying desperately to reach his mother. The anxiety is compounded when her own son's call doesn't arrive at the appointed hour. The next call reveals that the child has died.

Cast
Archana as Sati Gujaral
Rajit Kapoor as Dr. Gopi Gujaral
Geshe Thupten Phelgye as Senior Monk
Master Jhang as Junior Monk
Dominique de Gasquet as French Lady Musician
Ram Gopal Bajaj
Rameshwari

References

External links

2002 films
Films directed by Shaji N. Karun
2000s Hindi-language films